Darilington  is an unincorporated community in Walton County, Florida, United States.

References

Unincorporated communities in Walton County, Florida
Unincorporated communities in Florida